Pryor's Location is situated on the Portage Lake Shipping Canal in Michigan, United States.  Very little remains of this small settlement but a sign at the intersection of Lake Avenue and Lakeshore Drive in Houghton, Michigan, into which it has been incorporated.  It is named after James Pryor, owner of Pryor Lumber and other businesses in the area.

Pryor Lumber was purchased by Albert W. Quandt and Edward A. Hamar in 1925 and renamed it the Hamar Quandt Company.  The Hamar Quandt Company operated in this location until approximately 1985. The Hamar Quandt Company has been renamed 41 Lumber.  The site of the lumber business is now the Houghton Super-8 Motel.

In the Copper Country of the Upper Peninsula of Michigan, a 'location' is a small settlement with few if any businesses.  Locations were generally inhabited by miners, people with mining-related jobs such as running the smelters, and their families.

References
The Daily Mining Gazette (September 23, 2003), p. 1

External links
Photograph of James Pryor

Geography of Houghton County, Michigan